Broka (masculine: Broks) is a Latvian surname. Individuals with the surname include:

Baiba Broka (born 1973), Latvian actress
Baiba Broka (born 1975), Latvian politician
Terēze Broka (1925–2018), Latvian conductor and educator

Latvian-language feminine surnames